John Phillip Bengtson (July 17, 1913 – December 18, 1994) was an American football player and coach.  He was a longtime assistant coach in college football and the National Football League (NFL), chiefly remembered as the successor to Vince Lombardi as head coach of the Green Bay Packers in 1968.

Career
Bengtson was a native of Roseau, Minnesota, and played tackle under Bernie Bierman at the University of Minnesota during the 1930s. In 1934, he earned All-America honors with the Golden Gophers, working in tandem with a player who went to coaching immortality: quarterback Bud Wilkinson.  

Bengtson took his first assistant coaching job at the University of Missouri in 1935, but soon returned to his alma mater as line coach, staying through the 1939 season. Beginning in 1940, he moved to Stanford University, where he served as an assistant coach for 12 years. Bengtson moved to the professional level in 1952 with the nearby San Francisco 49ers.

In seven seasons with the Niners, Bengtson served under three head coaches: (Buck Shaw, Red Strader, Frankie Albert) before being dismissed with Albert after the 1958 season.  Soon after, he was one of the first four assistants hired in Lombardi's first week with the Packers in early February 1959.  

Bengtson was the only assistant coach to stay for the entire nine-year tenure of Lombardi (1959–1967). His work as defensive coordinator of the Packers established his coaching ability and put him in line to succeed Lombardi. From 1961 to 1967, the Packers captured five NFL titles, and the first two Super Bowls.

Bengtson replaced Lombardi following the 1967 season; his low-key approach was in sharp contrast to the often-volatile Lombardi. With the aging of key players, this translated into mediocrity for the franchise. Bengtson's Packers were 20–21–1 in his three seasons as head coach. After a 6–8 record in 1970, he was relieved of his duties, replaced by Missouri head coach Dan Devine for the 1971 season. Devine lasted four seasons with the Packers, moving back to the collegiate level at the University of Notre Dame following the 1974 season.  Lombardi's former quarterback, Bart Starr, became the head coach of the Packers in 1975.

Bengtson resurfaced with the San Diego Chargers and New England Patriots, becoming the interim head coach of the Patriots in late 1972. Later, he was named the team's Director of Pro Scouting, staying through the 1974 season.
 
Bengtson died at age 81 after a long illness at his home in San Diego on December 18, 1994.

Head coaching record 

* Interim head coach

References

 

1913 births
1994 deaths
People from Roseau, Minnesota
American football tackles
Green Bay Packers general managers
Green Bay Packers head coaches
Minnesota Golden Gophers football coaches
Minnesota Golden Gophers football players
Missouri Tigers football coaches
National Football League general managers
New England Patriots head coaches
New England Patriots coaches
San Diego Chargers coaches
San Francisco 49ers coaches
Stanford Cardinal football coaches
Players of American football from Minnesota